Explorer 46, (also Meteoroid Technology Satellite-A or MTS-A), was a NASA satellite launched as part of Explorer program.

Mission 
Explorer 46 was designed to provide data on the frequency and penetration energy of meteoroids and micrometeoroids in near-earth orbit. Explorer 46 consisted of a hexi-cylindrical bus covered with solar cells. Meteoroid impacts were detected and measured using bumper panels that extended after launch and gave the satellite a windmill-like appearance. The central hub of the satellite carried the velocity and impact experiments. Twenty meteoroid impacts were recorded by the bumper panels through December 1972. A set of capacitor detectors recorded over two thousand micrometeoroid hits over the same period.

Instruments 
 12 box-shaped velocity detectors at various locations along the spacecraft;
 Impact flux detectors, with 64 detectors to assess the population of very small particles.

Launch 
Explorer 46 was launched on 13 August 1972, at 15:10 UTC, from Wallops Flight Facility (WFF), with a Scout D-1 Launch vehicle.

Experiments

Meteoroid Penetration 
The objective of this experiment was to measure the meteoroid penetration rates of a bumper-protected target. Penetrations were measured, using 12 2-mil stainless-steel pressure cells located behind 1-mil stainless-steel bumpers. These 12 cells were mounted on 4 bumper panels which extended out from the cylindrical spacecraft body. Due to a malfunction, only two of the four bumper panels deployed.

Meteoroid Penetration Sensors 
This experiment measured meteoroid impacts using a thin film capacitor. Due to a spacecraft malfunction, this experiment had to be turned off two weeks after launch, but it had already recorded 2000 micrometeoroid impacts by that time. It was reactivated in August 1974.

Meteoroid Velocity Sensors 
This experiment measured the velocity of impacting micrometeoroids, using two thin-film capacitors and measuring the time-of-flight between them. Due to difficulties with the spacecraft, this experiment had to be turned off two weeks after launch, but it was turned on again for 1 week in August 1974.

Atmospheric entry 
Explorer 46 reentered in the atmosphere on 2 November 1979.

See also 

 Explorer program

References

External links 
 Explorer 46: Meteoroid Technology Satellite (backup) Smithsonian National Air and Space Museum

Spacecraft launched in 1972
Explorers Program
Spacecraft which reentered in 1979